Central European Media Enterprises Ltd. (CME) is a media and entertainment company that operates television channels in Bulgaria, Croatia, Czech Republic, Romania, Slovakia and Slovenia. Until its acquisition by PPF Group N.V. in October 2020, the company was listed on NASDAQ and Prague Stock Exchange under the ticker symbol CETV. It has since been delisted.

History
Central European Media Enterprises Ltd. was co-founded in 1991 by Americans Ronald Lauder and Mark Palmer in Germany as CEDC GmbH (Central European Development Corporation), and later changed its name and reincorporated in the Netherlands as Central European Media Enterprises (CME). It started broadcasting its first channel in the Czech Republic in 1994. 

On 23 March 2009, Time Warner (now  Warner Bros. Discovery) announced it would invest $241.5 million in CME for a 31% stake. By 2Q 2013, Time Warner had acquired a controlling interest in CME in a series of transactions.

In October 2019, AT&T signed an agreement to sell WarnerMedia's stake to PPF. The transaction valued at $2.1 billion was completed in October 2020.

On 14 February 2022, Central European Media Enterprises announced buying RTL Hrvatska from RTL Group for €50 million. The transaction was closed on 1 June 2022.

Operations
CME is the broadcast market leader in most countries where it has television stations. CME currently operates 43 television channels broadcasting to approximately 49 million people across 6 countries. CME develops and produces content for its television channels, and its content is also consumed through subscription and advertising VOD.
The company operates 4 radio channels in Bulgaria. It also operates the Voyo streaming platform.

Television channels
Bulgaria
 bTV 
 bTV Cinema 
 bTV Comedy 
 bTV Action 
 bTV Lady 
 Ring

Croatia
 RTL
 RTL 2
 RTL Kockica
 RTL Living
 RTL Crime
 RTL Passion
 RTL Adria
 RTL Croatia World

Czech Republic
 TV Nova 
 Nova Cinema 
 Nova Action
 Nova Fun
 Nova Gold
 Nova Lady
 Nova Sport 1 
 Nova Sport 2
 Nova Sport 3
 Nova Sport 4
 Nova International

Romania
 Pro TV (also broadcast in Republic of Moldova as a simulcast feed)
 Acasă (also broadcast in Republic of Moldova as a simulcast feed)
 Acasă Gold
 Pro Arena
 Pro Cinema
 Pro TV Internațional
 Pro TV Chisinau

Slovakia
 Markíza 
 Markíza Doma
 Markíza Dajto
 Markíza Krimi
 Markíza International

Slovenia
 Pop TV
 Kanal A 
 Brio
 Oto
 Kino
 Astra

CME Content Academy
In 2022 Central European Media Enterprises Ltd. launched CME Content Academy. CME Content Academy’s two-year course is designed to provide participants with a foundation across various film-making disciplines, enabling students to become TV professionals.

The practice is divided according to the production scheme of TV Nova and Markíza and takes place in Brno, Prague and Bratislava.

See also 

CME/Lauder v. Czech Republic

References

External links

 
Companies of Bermuda
Television companies
Companies formerly listed on the Nasdaq
Pan-European media companies
2020 mergers and acquisitions
Mass media companies established in 1991
Former AT&T subsidiaries
Former Time Warner subsidiaries
Private equity portfolio companies
PPF Group